Martina Havenith-Newen (born 13 April 1963) is a German chemist.

Education and career 
She studied physics and mathematics at the University of Bonn from 1981 to 1987. She finished her doctorate in physics in 1990 and completed her habilitation in 1997.

Since 1998, she is a professor at the Ruhr University Bochum.

Research 
Her research focuses on intermolecular interactions, aggregation, solvation, molecular recognition, and infra-red and THz spectroscopy.

Selected publications

Awards 
She is a member of the Academy of Sciences Leopoldina, the Academy of Europe, and the Österreichischer Wissenschaftsrat.

References

20th-century German chemists
German women chemists
University of Bonn alumni
Academic staff of Ruhr University Bochum
1963 births
Living people
Members of the German Academy of Sciences Leopoldina
21st-century German chemists
20th-century German women scientists